Herbert Raglan (born August 5, 1967) is a Canadian former professional ice hockey player, who played 343 games in the National Hockey League with the St. Louis Blues, Quebec Nordiques, Tampa Bay Lightning, and Ottawa Senators.

Raglan was born in Peterborough, Ontario, and his father was Clare Raglan. As a youth, he played in the 1980 Quebec International Pee-Wee Hockey Tournament with a minor ice hockey team from Peterborough.

Career statistics

References

External links 

1967 births
Living people
Atlanta Knights players
Brantford Smoke players
Canadian ice hockey right wingers
Central Texas Stampede players
Halifax Citadels players
Ice hockey people from Ontario
Kalamazoo Wings (1974–2000) players
Kingston Canadians players
Ottawa Senators players
Quebec Nordiques players
Sportspeople from Peterborough, Ontario
St. Louis Blues draft picks
St. Louis Blues players
Tampa Bay Lightning players